July 2 - Eastern Orthodox Church calendar - July 4

All fixed commemorations below are celebrated on July 16 by Old Calendar.

For July 3rd, Orthodox Churches on the Old Calendar commemorate the Saints listed on June 20.

Saints
 Martyr Hyacinth the Cubicularius, of Caesarea in Cappadocia (108)
 Martyrs Theodotus and Theodota, martyred with St. Hyacinth at Caesarea in Cappadocia (108)
 Martyrs Diomedes, Eulampius, Asclepiodotus, and Golinduc, who suffered with Saint Hyacinth (108)
 Saint Anatolius of Laodicea, Bishop of Laodicea, and his successor, St. Eusebius (3rd century)
 Martyrs Mark and Mocius (4th century)
 Saint Alexander, founder of the Monastery of the Unsleeping Ones ("the Ever-Vigilant"), Constantinople (c. 430) (see also: January 15, February 23)
 Saint Anatolius, Patriarch of Constantinople (458)
 Saint Isaiah the Solitary, of Scetis and Palestine (491)
 Saint Symeon the Stylite (the third stylite), of Cilicia (6th century)
 Martyr Theodota (712)

Pre-Schism Western saints
 Saint Dathus (Datus), Bishop of Ravenna in Italy (190)
 Saints Irenaeus, a deacon, and Mustiola, a noble lady, martyred in Chiusi in Tuscany in Italy under Aurelian for ministering to other martyrs and burying their relics (273)
 Saint Heliodorus of Altino, first bishop of Altinum (Altino) (c. 390)
 St. Byblig of Carnarvon (Biblig, Peblig, Piblig, Publicius), Gwynedd, in Wales.
 Saint Germanus, Bishop of the Isle of Man and Enlightener of Peel, nephew of St. Patrick of Ireland (474)
 St. Bladus (Baldus), an early Bishop of the Isle of Man.
 Saint Gunthiern, a prince in Wales who went to Brittany and lived as a hermit (c. 500)
 Saint Leo II, Pope of Rome (683)
 Saint Cilléne Droichtech, Abbot of Iona (c. 752)
 Saint Guthagon, born in Ireland, he crossed to Belgium and became a hermit (8th century)

Post-Schism Orthodox saints
 Saint George the Godbearer, of the Black Mountain, teacher of St. George of Mount Athos (1068)
 Saint Basil the Bishop of Ryazan (1295)
 Venerable Anatolius, recluse, of the Near Caves in Kiev (12th century)
 Venerable Anatolius, recluse, of the Far Caves in Kiev (13th century)
 Saints Basil (1249) and Constantine (1257), holy princes of Yaroslavl (13th century)
 Saint Basil, Archbishop of Novgorod (1352)
 Saints John and Longinus, Wonderworkers of Yarensk, Solovki (1544-1545)
 Blessed John of Moscow, Fool-for-Christ (1589)
 Venerable Nicodemus of Khozyuga (Kozhe Lake), monk of Kozhaezersk Monastery (1640)
 Blessed Michael, Herodion, Basil, and Thomas, Fools-for-Christ, of Solvychegodsk (17th century)
 Saint Joachim the New Godbeaerer, of Notenon Monastery in Achaia (17th century)

New martyrs and confessors
 New Monk-martyr Gerasimus the New, of Carpenision, at Constantinople (1812)
 New Hieromartyr Anthony (Bystrov), Archbishop of Arkhangelsk and Kholmogorsk (1931)

Other commemorations
 Icon of the Mother of God the "Milk-Giver" (Galaktotrophousa), of the Hilandar Monastery on Mount Athos.
 Second translation (1652) of the relics of Hieromartyr Philip, Metropolitan of Moscow and all Russia (1569)
 Uncovering of the relics (1959) of Hieromartyr Raphael of Lesbos (1463), in Mytilene.
 Uncovering of the relics (2005) of Sylvester (Olshevsky), Bishop of Omsk (1920) (see also: February 25)
 Repose of Nun Euphrosyne "the Unknown," of Kolyupanovo, Aleksin (1855)

Icon gallery

Notes

References

Sources
 July 3/July 16. Orthodox Calendar (PRAVOSLAVIE.RU).
 July 16 / July 3. HOLY TRINITY RUSSIAN ORTHODOX CHURCH (A parish of the Patriarchate of Moscow).
 July 3. OCA - The Lives of the Saints.
 July 3. The Year of Our Salvation - Holy Transfiguration Monastery, Brookline, Massachusetts. 
 The Autonomous Orthodox Metropolia of Western Europe and the Americas (ROCOR). St. Hilarion Calendar of Saints for the year of our Lord 2004. St. Hilarion Press (Austin, TX). p. 49.
 The Third Day of the Month of July. Orthodoxy in China.
 July 3. Latin Saints of the Orthodox Patriarchate of Rome.
 The Roman Martyrology. Transl. by the Archbishop of Baltimore. Last Edition, According to the Copy Printed at Rome in 1914. Revised Edition, with the Imprimatur of His Eminence Cardinal Gibbons. Baltimore: John Murphy Company, 1916. pp. 193–194.
 Rev. Richard Stanton. A Menology of England and Wales, or, Brief Memorials of the Ancient British and English Saints Arranged According to the Calendar, Together with the Martyrs of the 16th and 17th Centuries. London: Burns & Oates, 1892. pp. 305–306.
Greek Sources
 Great Synaxaristes:  3 ΙΟΥΛΙΟΥ. ΜΕΓΑΣ ΣΥΝΑΞΑΡΙΣΤΗΣ.
  Συναξαριστής. 3 Ιουλίου. ECCLESIA.GR. (H ΕΚΚΛΗΣΙΑ ΤΗΣ ΕΛΛΑΔΟΣ). 
  ΙΟΥΛΙΟΣ. Αποστολική Διακονία της Εκκλησίας της Ελλάδος (Apostoliki Diakonia of the Church of Greece).
  03/07/2018. Ορθόδοξος Συναξαριστής. 
Russian Sources
  16 июля (3 июля). Православная Энциклопедия под редакцией Патриарха Московского и всея Руси Кирилла (электронная версия). (Orthodox Encyclopedia - Pravenc.ru).
  3 июля по старому стилю / 16 июля по новому стилю. Русская Православная Церковь - Православный церковный календарь на 2017 год.
  3 июля (ст.ст.) 16 июля 2014 (нов. ст.). Русская Православная Церковь Отдел внешних церковных связей. (DECR).

July in the Eastern Orthodox calendar